Ectoedemia ulmella is a moth of the family Nepticulidae. It is found in Kentucky and Pennsylvania in the United States.

The wingspan is 4–5 mm. There are two generations per year. Mature larvae are found in July and in September.

The larvae feed on Ulmus fulva and Ulmus thomasii. They mine the leaves of their host plant. The mine starts as a very fine brown, or rarely whitish line, not very winding in its early course, and at about half its length abruptly enlarging. From there it continues to increase gradually in width. The broad portion of the mine is usually so much contorted that it is not possible to trace the course of the mine, the whole having the appearance of an irregular blotch. The cocoon is reddish brown. A large proportion of the larvae spin cocoons within the mines, generally in the center of the blotch.

External links
Nepticulidae of North America

Nepticulidae
Moths of North America

Taxa named by Annette Frances Braun
Leaf miners
Moths described in 1912